Criminal Tango is an album released in 1986 by Manfred Mann's Earth Band with Chris Thompson. Founding guitarist/vocalist Mick Rogers returned to the band for this album and is still an active member. The new bassist Steve Kinch joined the band only when parts of the album were already recorded. Kinch therefore shared the bass parts on this album with bassists Durban Betancourt-Laverde and John Giblin. This is their first album for the Virgin Records label after eleven years with Bronze Records.

Track listing

Side one
"Going Underground" (Paul Weller) – 5:18
"Who Are The Mystery Kids?" (Manfred Mann, Garland Jeffreys) – 3:44
"Banquet" (Joni Mitchell) – 5:17
"Killer On The Loose" (Denny Newman) – 3:59

Side two
 "Do Anything You Wanna Do" (Graham Douglas, Edwin Hollis) – 4:14
"Rescue" (Mann, Mick Rogers) – 2:59
"You Got Me Right Through The Heart" (Robert Byrne) – 3:53
"Bulldog" (John Lennon, Paul McCartney) – 4:23
"Crossfire" (Mann, Rogers, John Lingwood) – 3:47

Bonus Tracks (1999 CD re-issue)
 "Runner" (12" version) (Ian Thomas) – 4:39
"Rebel" (U.S. single version) (Reg Laws) – 4:08
"Do Anything You Wanna Do" (12" version) (Douglas, Hollis) – 6:28
"Going Underground" (alternate single version) (Weller) – 3:01

Personnel

The Earth Band
Manfred Mann – keyboards
John Lingwood – drums, percussion
Mick Rogers – guitar, vocals
Chris Thompson – lead vocals
Steve Kinch – bass
Durban Betancourt-Laverde – bass

Additional musicians
John Giblin – bass

Technical
 Manfred Mann, Steve Forward – producers
 Terry Medhurst – engineer
 Pete Hammond – engineer
 Nigel Gilroy, Stuart Barry – assistant engineers
 Roddy Matthews – mixing engineer (track 4)
 The Leisure Process – cover design

References

External links

Manfred Mann's Earth Band albums
1986 albums
Virgin Records albums